Hoseynabad-e Ali Akbarkhan (also Romanized as Ḩoseynābād-e ‘Alī Akbarkhān; also known as Ḩoseynābād, Ḩoseynābād-e Pā’īn, Ḩoseynābād-e Soflá, and Husainābād) is a village in Azadegan Rural District, in the Central District of Rafsanjan County, Kerman Province, Iran. At the 2006 census, its population was 109, in 30 families.

References 

Populated places in Rafsanjan County